Charles Andres House is a historic house on Middle Bass Island in Lake Erie, off the northern coast of Ohio. The house was built by winemaker Charles Andres, a German immigrant who moved to Middle Bass Island in 1854. Andres bought the  plot where he built his house in 1866, using most of the land for his vineyards. Ohio's Lake Erie islands, particularly the Bass Islands, were a major winemaking center in the nineteenth century, and most of its wineries were small operations run by German immigrants such as Andres. The two-story house has a vernacular design which incorporates elements of the Italianate and Greek Revival styles. Its design is typical of Bass Islands architecture of the era, as winemakers often put their profits toward large and attractive homes.

The house was added to the National Register of Historic Places on November 6, 1995.

Notes 

Houses on the National Register of Historic Places in Ohio
Houses in Ottawa County, Ohio
National Register of Historic Places in Ottawa County, Ohio
Greek Revival houses in Ohio
Italianate architecture in Ohio
Houses completed in 1866
1866 establishments in Ohio